A1 Team Brazil is the Brazilian team of A1 Grand Prix, an international racing series.

Management 
The seat holder for A1 Team Brazil is the former Formula One World Champion Emerson Fittipaldi. Since 2005, Brazilian footballer Ronaldo has been the co-owner of A1 Team Brazil. The team principal is Fernando Patva. Technical support is provided by DS Motorsport Ltd.

History

2008–09 season 

Driver: Felipe Guimarães

2007–08 season 

Drivers: Sérgio Jimenez, Bruno Junqueira, Alexandre Negrão

Performances picked up during the 2007–08 season, with the team scoring a podium in Malaysia, and finishing 11th overall.

2006–07 season 

Drivers: Bruno Junqueira, Raphael Matos, Vítor Meira, Tuka Rocha

The team suffered a bad season, scoring points in only four races and finishing 18th.

2005–06 season 

Drivers: Christian Fittipaldi, Nelson Piquet Jr.

After taking maximum points in the opening round of the season, Team Brazil gradually lost competitiveness as the season went on. They finished 6th in the championship.

Drivers

Complete A1 Grand Prix results 

(key), "spr" indicate a Sprint Race, "fea" indicate a Main Race.

References

External links

A1gp.com Official A1 Grand Prix Web Site
Official Team Website - A1 Team Brazil

Brazil A1 team
Brazilian auto racing teams
National sports teams of Brazil
Auto racing teams established in 2005
Auto racing teams disestablished in 2009